The Lilleküla Stadium (known as A. Le Coq Arena for sponsorship reasons) is a football stadium in Tallinn, Estonia. It is the home ground of football clubs Flora and Levadia, and the Estonia national football team. With a capacity of 14,336, it is the largest football stadium in Estonia.

Lilleküla Stadium was the venue for the 2018 UEFA Super Cup and the 2012 UEFA European U19 Championship.

History

In July 1998, FC Flora football club submitted a planning application to Tallinn City Council, requesting permission to build a new stadium on wasteland between railway lines in Kitseküla, close to the border with neighbouring Lilleküla. Receiving the council's approval, Flora signed a 99-year lease on the estate and construction began in October 2000. The stadium was designed by Haldo Oravas.

The stadium was officially opened 2 June 2001, with a 2002 FIFA World Cup qualification match between Estonia and the Netherlands. The match saw Estonia's Andres Oper become the first player to score at the new stadium when he scored in the 65th minute, with the full-time result being a 4–2 victory for the Netherlands.

In January 2002, A. Le Coq bought naming rights for the stadium and Lilleküla Stadium.

During the 2012 UEFA European Under-19 Championship, the stadium hosted six out of 15 tournament matches, including the final, which saw Spain defeat Greece 1–0.

In 2012, Flora completed the transfer ownership of the Lilleküla Football Complex, including Lilleküla Stadium, to the Estonian Football Association.

In September 2016, it was announced that the stadium would host the 2018 UEFA Super Cup. In preparation for the match, the stadium's capacity was increased from 10,000 to 15,000. The 2018 UEFA Super Cup match between the 2017–18 UEFA Champions League winners Real Madrid and the 2017–18 UEFA Europa League winners Atlético Madrid was held on 15 August 2018, with Atlético Madrid winning 4–2 in extra time.

Lilleküla Football Complex
Lilleküla Stadium is part of the Lilleküla Football Complex, which also includes two grass surface pitches, two artificial turf pitches of which one is the 1,198-seat Sportland Arena, and an indoor football hall named EJL Jalgpallihall.

Music

Aside from football and other sporting events, several concerts have been held at Lilleküla Stadium. Lenny Kravitz performed in 2005 and Aerosmith in 2007.

Gallery

References

External links

 Lilleküla Stadium at Estonian Football Association 
 Lilleküla Stadium at FC Flora 

2001 establishments in Estonia
Sports venues completed in 2001
FC Flora
Estonia national football team
Football venues in Estonia
Sports venues in Tallinn
Estonia